The 1877–78 season was the fifth Scottish football season in which Dumbarton competed at a national level.

Scottish Cup

During the early years of the Scottish Cup, the earlier rounds of the competition were played on a regional basis, which was always a tough proposition as three of the top Scottish clubs at the time were from Dumbartonshire.  This season Dumbarton came up against Vale of Leven in the second round, and lost (to the eventual champions) after a 1-1 draw.

Friendlies

During the season, 12 'friendly' matches were played, including home and away fixtures against local teams Renton and Alexandria, and also Glasgow sides, Rangers and South Western. Of these matches, 8 were won, 1 drawn and 3 lost, scoring 32 goals and conceding 8.

Player statistics

Of note amongst those appearing in club colours for the first time this season were Joe Lindsay, Jock Hutcheson and William McKinnon.

Only includes appearances and goals in competitive Scottish Cup matches.

Source:

International trial
In order to select a 'Scotland' team to play against England, an international trial match was held for Dunbartonshire players on 9 February 1878 at Alexandria. Archie Lang, Peter Miller, Alex Galbraith, Joe Lindsay and J McMaster all played.
A month later on 9 March a second trial match was held at Ibrox to consider selection for the team to play against Wales, with Peter Miller and Alex Galbraith playing.
In the end however, none of the Dumbarton men were capped.

References

Dumbarton F.C. seasons
Scottish football clubs 1877–78 season